Gaetano "James" Senese (born 6 January 1945) is an Italian saxophonist, composer, and singer-songwriter.

Life and career 
Senese was born in Naples, the son of Anna Senese and James Smith, an American soldier from North Carolina in Italy because of World War II. Senese's father moved back to the US eighteen months after Gaetano's birth and never returned.
Senese started playing the saxophone at 12 years old. He made his professional debut in the 1960s, as a member of the rhythm and blues band  (later known as Showmen 2), with whom he won the 1968 edition of Cantagiro.

In 1974 Senese co-founded and led the critically acclaimed jazz-rock group . After the group disbanded in 1978, he started a long collaboration with Pino Daniele, both in studio and on stage. His first solo album was released in 1983 by Polydor Records.

A documentary film about Senese, James, was directed in 2020 by Andrea Della Monica and premiered at the 77th edition of the Venice Film Festival.

Discography
 James Senese (Polydor, 1983)
 Il passo del gigante (Tobacco, 1984)
 Alhambra (EMI Italiana, 1988)
 Hey James (Blue Ange1, 1991)
 Sabato Santo (Polosud, 2000)
 Passpartù (ITWHY, 2003)
 Tribù e passione (with Enzo Gragnaniello) (Edel Italia, 2003)
 E' Fernut' 'o Tiempo (Arealive, 2012)
 O sanghe (Alabianca/Warner, 2016)

References

External links

1945 births
Living people
Musicians from Naples
Italian saxophonists
Male saxophonists
Italian male singer-songwriters
Italian jazz musicians
Italian people of African-American descent
21st-century saxophonists
21st-century Italian male singers
Male jazz musicians
20th-century Italian male singers